Kastrat may refer to:

Kastrat (municipality), a former municipality in Albania
Kastrat (settlement), Albania
Kastrat (Kuršumlija), Serbia

See also 
 Kastrati (disambiguation)